Donald Gilbert (1900–1961), named Hubert Donald Macgeoch Gilbert at birth, was an English sculptor and modeller. He studied at prestigious art schools in England, Rome and Florence before beginning his career. He did works under his own name, such as commissions for the Adelphi building in London. He also collaborated with his father, Walter Gilbert, a sculptor at H.H. Martyn.

Personal life and studies
Gilbert was born in Burcot, Worcestershire in 1900 and as a child studied at Rugby School.

Aside from studies in Florence and Rome, Gilbert studied at the Birmingham Central School of Art, the Royal College of Art and the Royal Academy, where he was a silver and bronze medalist. In 1927 he was highly commended in the British Prix de Rome final competition.

Gilbert, who worked under his full name, became a member of Royal Birmingham Society of Artists in 1937. He exhibited at Chenil Galleries, Glasgow Institute of the Fine Arts, Royal Society of Artists Birmingham, Royal Academy, Royal Hibernian Academy, Royal Scottish Academy and Walker Gallery in Liverpool.

Works
Gilbert's works include decorative and animal sculpture, portrait busts, pottery and sculptural works that he collaborated on with his father at H.H. Marten. He designed pottery for Ashtead Potters and Bourne Denby Pottery. One of his most notable works was a carving for London's Adelphi Building.

Works with Walter Gilbert

It was in around 1922 that Gilbert worked as a modeller and worked with his father, Walter Gilbert.

See also

 Walter Gilbert

References

External links
 Donald Gilbert pottery
 'Aviator' sculpture

English sculptors
English male sculptors
Modern sculptors
1900 births
1961 deaths
20th-century British sculptors
19th-century British sculptors
19th-century British male artists